The China Gospel Fellowship (Chinese: 中华福音团契), also known as the Tanghe Fellowship (唐河团契), is one of the largest evangelical Christian religious movements in China, and is a house church network formed in the province of Henan.

History
The Tanghe Fellowship was founded in the 1980s.

In 2002, Eastern Lightning, a Chinese Christian new religious movement, allegedly kidnapped 34 of the Fellowship's leading members and held them for two months. In 2004, more than 100 leaders of the church were arrested as part of governmental raids against unregistered churches. Sources consider it to be among the one of the largest Protestant denominations in the world, and the third largest in China, behind the state-supported Three-Self Patriotic Movement and the Fangcheng Fellowship.

See also

List of the largest Protestant bodies

References

External links
China Gospel Fellowship official website

Protestantism in China
Religious organizations established in the 1980s
Evangelical denominations in Asia